Glyndwr John Robert Parry (GJR Parry) FRHistS was born in Tredegar, Monmouthshire on October 31, 1953. He metriculated at St John's College Cambridge in September 1972 and graduated BA from the University of Cambridge in June 1975, where he was also awarded a PhD in History in 1982. In 1987 he published A Protestant Vision: William Harrison and the Reformation of Elizabethan England with Cambridge University Press. , he was a senior lecturer in history at Victoria University Wellington, New Zealand.

References

1953 births
Fellows of the Royal Historical Society
20th-century Welsh historians
21st-century New Zealand historians
Living people
People from Tredegar
Academic staff of the Victoria University of Wellington
British emigrants to New Zealand